Herbert Winfield Spencer (April 7, 1905 – September 18, 1992) was a Chilean-born American film and television composer and orchestrator.

Spencer gained industry fame when he teamed up with fellow 20th Century Fox orchestrator Earle Hagen in 1953 to create the Spencer-Hagen Orchestra. They recorded albums for an offshoot of the RCA label "X", and Liberty, and also formed a film scoring service called Music Scoring, Inc. (MSI). Spencer and Hagen scored many early sitcoms and other television shows, including The Danny Thomas Show, Where's Raymond?, renamed The Ray Bolger Show, It's Always Jan starring Janis Paige and My Sister Eileen. Earle wrote the underscore, while Herb wrote the arrangements. Occasionally, these chores overlapped, when time permitted. MSI was dissolved about 1960, and Spencer went on to score The Joey Bishop Show. Spencer also co-wrote "The Fishin' Hole", The Andy Griffith Show theme.

Spencer also helped orchestrate such noted film musicals as Holiday Inn (1942), Gentlemen Prefer Blondes (1953), Call Me Madam (1953), Carousel (1956), Funny Girl (1968), and Hello, Dolly! (1969), and received the credit "musical associate" for his work on the film musical Man of La Mancha (1972). He also composed the music for Sol y nieve (1962, a Chilean documentary).

Later in life, Spencer was known mostly for his collaborations with composer John Williams as orchestrator and arranger (from 1967 until his death) for many of his film scores, such as the original Star Wars trilogy, E.T. the Extra-Terrestrial and the Indiana Jones film series.

He orchestrated the stage musicals The Good Companions (1974, for André Previn), and Thomas And The King (1975, for John Williams). Neither show was a success.

Spencer was also principal orchestrator for the original version of Clash of the Titans (1981).

References

External links 

1905 births
1992 deaths
American film score composers
American male film score composers
American television composers
American music arrangers
20th-century classical musicians
20th-century American composers
20th-century American male musicians
Chilean emigrants to the United States